Scaler may refer to:
 Periodontal scaler, an anti-plaque tool
 Video scaler, a system which converts video signals from one resolution to another
 Scaler (video game), a 2004 video game
 Fish scaler, a food preparation utensil

See also 
 Scalar (disambiguation)